Senator Gibbons may refer to:

Michael R. Gibbons (born 1959), Missouri State Senate
Sam Gibbons (1920–2012), Florida State Senate